Momma Don't Allow is a short British documentary film of 1956 about a show of the Chris Barber band with Ottilie Patterson in a north London trad jazz club - specifically the Fisherman's Arms in Wood Green. The film features skip jiving by the audience.

It was co-directed by Karel Reisz and Tony Richardson and filmed by Walter Lassally. It was produced by the British Film Institute Experimental Film Fund. It was first shown as part of the first Free cinema programme at the National Film Theatre in February 1956.

References

External links 

BFI's "screenonline" on Momma Don't Allow.

1956 films
1950s short documentary films
Cultural history of the United Kingdom
Films directed by Karel Reisz
Films directed by Tony Richardson
Documentary films about jazz music and musicians
1956 documentary films
Documentary films about London
British short documentary films
British black-and-white films
1950s English-language films
1950s British films